The Canadian Coast Guard Ship Revisor is a Canadian Coast Guard inshore fisheries research and survey vessel.

The boat is a Cabin cruiser (maximum of 2 passengers) for use for offshore hydrographic survey work.
The Revisor has been decommissioned and is now in the possession of Kyle Deschamps and his 4 children of Victoria B.C. He aims to restore the revisor and is currently looking for anyone with nautical education to aid him.

The vessel has been made available in the past for use by United States Government researchers with NASA's Jet Propulsion Lab in Pasadena, California, as well as university research work by the Seafloor Mapping Lab at California State University in Monterey Bay, California.

CGS Base Patricia Bay

Most ships at this base are research vessels:

  - research vessel
  - survey ship
  - research vessel
  - search and rescue

References
  official Revisor web-page, Canadian Coast Guard
  Meet the Oceanographers: The birth of a cold water reef, Jet Propulsion Laboratory

Ships of the Canadian Coast Guard
Research vessels of Canada